Quicky is a rabbit character that Nestlé's chocolate-focused brand Nesquik uses as their official mascot. The mascot made his debut in 1973. Quicky's cereal box appearance and given name evokes associations with speed and easiness within the consumers mind. The animal choice of rabbit is not a coincidence, but rather a clever choice, since rabbits are known for their speed. In the TV commercials Quicky's voice acting work is done by Barry Gordon, but sometimes also by other male actors. The mascot's outlook was somewhat redesigned from 2005 and onwards to appear more detailed and modern.

Toy items
A LEGO minifigure version of Quicky was released in 2001.

See also

 Ronald McDonald
 Pillsbury Doughboy
 Tony the Tiger
 Mr. Peanut
 Kool-Aid Man
 Snap, Crackle and Pop
 Chester Cheetah
 Toucan Sam
 Duracell Bunny
 Charlie the Tuna
 Michelin Man

References

Nestlé
Advertising characters
Rabbit and hare mascots
Corporate mascots
Male characters in advertising
Fictional rabbits and hares
Mascots introduced in 1973